Amel Džuzdanović (born 26 August 1994) is a Slovenian footballer who plays as a midfielder.

References

External links
NZS profile 

1994 births
Living people
Slovenian footballers
Association football midfielders
ND Gorica players
NK Brda players
Slovenian PrvaLiga players
Slovenian Second League players
Slovenia youth international footballers
Slovenia under-21 international footballers
Place of birth missing (living people)